The Door is a 2009 German science fiction thriller film directed by Anno Saul and starring Mads Mikkelsen and Jessica Schwarz.

Plot
An artist who, after losing his daughter, discovers a mysterious doorway leading to the past.

Cast

References

External links 
 

German science fiction thriller films
2009 films
2000s science fiction thriller films
2000s German-language films
2000s German films